= Brian F. Downing =

American politician

Member of the New Hampshire House of Representatives from the Rockingham 5th district
- In office 1980–1982

Personal details
- Party: Democratic

Brian F. Downing is an American politician. A member of the Democratic Party, he served the New Hampshire House of Representatives from 1980 to 1982.
